The 1996 All-SEC football team consists of American football players selected to the All-Southeastern Conference (SEC) chosen by various selectors for the 1996 NCAA Division I-A football season.

The Florida Gators won the conference, beating the Alabama Crimson Tide 45 to 30 in the SEC Championship game. The Gators then won the national championship, defeating the Florida State Seminoles 52 to 20 in the Sugar Bowl.

Florida quarterback Danny Wuerffel repeated as SEC Player of the Year.

Offensive selections

Quarterbacks
Danny Wuerffel, Florida (AP-1, FN)
Peyton Manning, Tennessee (AP-2)

Running backs
 Kevin Faulk, LSU (AP-1)
 Duce Staley, South Carolina (AP-1)
Dennis Riddle, Alabama (AP-2)
Robert Edwards, Georgia (AP-2)

Wide receivers
Reidel Anthony, Florida (AP-1)
Joey Kent, Tennessee (AP-1)
Hines Ward, Georgia (AP-2)
Ike Hilliard, Florida (AP-2, FN)

Centers
Jeff Mitchell, Florida (AP-1, FN)
John Causey, Alabama (AP-2)

Guards
Alan Faneca, LSU (AP-1)
Donnie Young, Florida (AP-1, FN)
Victor Riley, Auburn (AP-2)
Will Friend, Alabama (AP-2)

Tackles
Adam Meadows, Georgia (AP-1)
Brent Smith, Miss. St. (AP-1)
Jamar Nesbit, South Carolina (AP-1)
Randy Wheeler, South Carolina (AP-2)
Ben Bordelon, LSU (AP-2)

Tight ends
 David LaFleur, LSU (AP-1)
Kris Mangum, Ole Miss  (AP-2)

Defensive selections

Defensive ends
Leonard Little, Tennessee (AP-1)
Michael Myers, Alabama (AP-1)
Chris Hood, Alabama (AP-2)
Chris Ward, Kentucky (AP-2)

Defensive tackles 
Ed Chester, Florida (AP-1, FN)
Chuck Wiley, LSU (AP-1)
Anthony McFarland, LSU (AP-2)
Jason Ferguson, Georgia (AP-2)

Linebackers
Dwayne Rudd, Alabama (AP-1)
Takeo Spikes, Auburn (AP-1)
Jamie Duncan, Vanderbilt (AP-1)
James Bates, Florida (AP-1)
Paul Lacoste, Miss. St. (AP-2)
Ralph Staten, Alabama (AP-2)
Greg Bright, Georgia (AP-2)

Cornerbacks
Anthone Lott, Florida (AP-1, FN)
Deshea Townsend, Alabama (AP-1)
Terry Fair, Tennessee (AP-2)
Fred Weary, Florida (AP-2, FN)

Safeties 
Kevin Jackson, Alabama (AP-1)
Lawrence Wright, Florida (AP-1)
Van Hiles, Kentucky (AP-2)
Arturo Freeman, South Carolina (AP-2)
Corey Johnson, Georgia (AP-2)

Special teams

Kickers
Jaret Holmes, Auburn (AP-1)
Jeff Hall, Tennessee (AP-2)

Punters
Bill Marinangel, Vanderbilt (AP-1)
Andy Russ, Miss. St. (AP-2)

Return specialist
Terry Fair, Tennessee (AP-1)
John Avery, Ole Miss (AP-2)

Key

AP = Associated Press

FN = Football News

See also
1996 College Football All-America Team

References

All-Southeastern Conference
All-SEC football teams